Alfa Bank may refer to:
 Alfa-Bank, a commercial bank in Russia
 Alfa Bank (Brazil) or Banco Alfa, a commercial bank in São Paulo

Alfa Bank Kazakhstan
Alfa Bank Ukraine
Alfa-Bank Finance

See also
Alpha Bank, Greek